Mark Slater is a British fund manager, business writer and co-founder of Slater Investments. He is the son of the financier Jim Slater.

Slater's father gave him money to invest when he was sixteen. He worked as a journalist for the Investors Chronicle. In 1994, with Ralph Baber, he started a fund management company, Slater Investments.

In March 2016, Slater and Steve Rawlings made a successful bid to change the management at Lakehouse, a building contractor in which they had a substantial investment.

Recognition 

In 2014, Slater was named "fund manager of the year" by City A.M.

In 2016 he was first on a list published by The Daily Telegraph of UK fund managers who had achieved an average return of more than 10 per cent over ten years.

References 

British business writers
Living people
Alumni of the University of Cambridge
British money managers
1960 births